Lanthanum(III) iodide is an inorganic compound containing lanthanum and iodine with the chemical formula .

Synthesis
Lanthanum(III) iodide can be synthesised by the reaction of lanthanum metal with mercury(II) iodide:

2 La + 3 HgI2 → 2 LaI3 + 3 Hg

It can also be prepared from the elements, that is by the reaction of metallic lanthanum with iodine:

2 La + 3 I2 → 2 LaI3

While lanthanum(III) iodide solutions can be generated by dissolving lanthanum oxide in hydroiodic acid, the product will hydrolyse and form polymeric hydroxy species:

La2O3 + 6 HI → 2 LaI3 + 3 H2O → further reactions

Structure
Lanthanum(III) iodide adopts the same crystal structure as plutonium(III) bromide, with 8-coordinate metal centres arranged in layers. This orthorhombic structure is typical of the triiodides of the lighter lanthanides (La–Nd), whereas heavier lanthanides tend to adopt the hexagonal bismuth(III) iodide structure.

Reactivity and applications
Lanthanum(III) iodide is very soluble in water and is deliquescent. Anhydrous lanthanum(III) iodide reacts with tetrahydrofuran to form a photoluminescent complex, LaI3(THF)4, with an average La–I bond length of 3.16 Å. This complex is a starting material for amide and cyclopentadienyl complexes of lanthanum.

Related compounds
Lanthanum also forms a diiodide, LaI2. It is an electride and is best formulated {LaIII,2I−,e−}, with the electron delocalised in a conduction band. Several other lanthanides form similar compounds, including CeI2, PrI2 and GdI2. Lanthanum diiodide adopts the same tetragonal crystal structure as PrI2.

Lanthanum(III) iodide reacts with lanthanum metal under an argon atmosphere in a tantalum capsule at 1225 K to form the mixed-valence compound La2I5.

Reduction of LaI2 or LaI3 with metallic sodium in an argon atmosphere at 550 °C gives lanthanum monoiodide, LaI, which has a hexagonal crystal structure.

References

Lanthanum compounds
Iodides
Inorganic compounds
Lanthanide halides